From the time of Peter the Great, forms of address in the Russian Empire had been well-codified, determined by a person’s title of honor, as well as military or civil rank (see Table of Ranks) and ecclesiastical order. One’s position within the clergy was considered most important, followed by title, and then by civil/military rank (e.g., a commoner in rank of Privy Councilor would be styled His Excellency) a prince of the same rank would retain the style of His Highness, while the same prince serving as an archbishop would be referred as His High Eminence. All of these styles are now obsolete and are only used in historical context.

See also
 East Slavic honorifics

References

External links
 Tsar's power in the 17th century: exaltation and status
 Forms of exaltation in Tsar's Russia
 Table of ranks 

Russian Empire
Society of the Russian Empire
Russian culture-related lists
Russian Empire
Russia history-related lists